Knut Lindberg (5 January 1880 – 23 June 1930) was a Finnish wrestler. He competed in the light heavyweight event at the 1912 Summer Olympics.

References

External links
 

1880 births
1930 deaths
People from Ingå
People from Uusimaa Province (Grand Duchy of Finland)
Swedish-speaking Finns
Olympic wrestlers of Finland
Wrestlers at the 1912 Summer Olympics
Finnish male sport wrestlers
Sportspeople from Uusimaa